The Chairman of the Legislative Assembly of Irkutsk Oblast is the presiding officer of that legislature.

Office-holders

Sources 
The Legislative Assembly of Irkutsk OblastReferences

References 

Lists of legislative speakers in Russia
Politics of Irkutsk Oblast